Siverek (from) is a city and district in the south-east of Turkey, in Şanlıurfa Province. The population of the city was 160,122 at the end of 2021, while the district had a population of 267,842. Siverek is in Şanlıurfa province but closer geographically to the large city of Diyarbakır (approx 83 km).

History
Siverek was historically known in medieval Arabic as Hisn ar-Ran, which was corrupted into Greek Chasanara as found in the Escorial Taktikon. The town came under Byzantine control sometime after 956 and by the early 970s had become the seat of a strategos.

In the Ottoman Empire period Siverek was within the Diyarbekir vilayet, and it had several Christian settlements.

Climate
Siverek has a hot-summer Mediterranean climate (Köppen climate classification: Csa).

Politics
In common with other districts of Şanlıurfa, business and politics in Siverek are strongly influenced, even controlled, by a powerful clan. Siverek is the home town of Sedat Bucak, the former DYP member of parliament who survived the car crash in the Susurluk scandal. He is the leader of the Bucak tribe, one of whom has represented the area in the Turkish Parliament since its foundation. Sedat Bucak remains a friend of former DYP leader Mehmet Ağar. In the local elections in March 2019, Şehmus Aydın was elected mayor. The current kaymakam is Mustafa Çiftçiler.

References

External links
 District governor's office
 Siverek
 Siverek Son Haber

Populated places in Şanlıurfa Province
Districts of Şanlıurfa Province
Kurdish settlements in Turkey